Deren FC is a professional football club from Deren, Mongolia. They currently play in the Mongolian National Premier League, making their debut appearance in the 2015 season.

The club is named after the Dutch company that constructed the MFF Football Centre.

History

Domestic history

Current squad
As of 2 March 2022

References

External links
Official website

Football clubs in Mongolia
Association football clubs established in 2008
2008 establishments in Mongolia